Edward Reynolds was a bishop and author.

Edward Reynolds may also refer to:
Edward Reynolds (MP), MP for Weymouth and Melcombe Regis
Edward Reynolds (cricketer) (1830–1908), English clergyman, schoolmaster and cricketer
Edward Reynolds (American politician) (1856–1938), Maine politician
Edward Reynolds (Australian politician) (1892–1971), Australian politician
Edward Reynolds (priest), son of the bishop
Ed Reynolds (born 1961), former American football linebacker
Ed Reynolds (safety) (born 1991), American football safety
Eddie Reynolds (c. 1935–1993), Irish footballer
Tige Reynolds (Edward Samuel Reynolds, 1877–1931), American cartoonist

See also